Xiang Liang (died 208 BC) was a military leader who led a rebellion against the Qin dynasty.

Early life
Xiang Liang was from Xiaxiang (下相; present-day Suqian, Jiangsu) and was a descendant of a family who served the Chu state in the Warring States period. Xiang Liang's father, was a famous general who led the Chu army to resist the invading Qin forces led by Wang Jian, and was killed in action in 223 BC when Qin annexed Chu.

After the fall of Chu, Xiang Liang and his brothers became commoners and lived under Qin rule for years. When Xiang Liang's elder brother Xiang Chao died, Xiang Liang took Xiang Chao's son, Xiang Yu, under his care. Xiang Liang doted on Xiang Yu and had his nephew instructed in scholarly arts and swordsmanship, but Xiang Yu did not master what he was taught and Xiang Liang was very displeased with him. When Xiang Yu expressed interest in military strategy, Xiang Liang tried to educate him but Xiang Yu stopped learning after grasping the main concepts, for he believed that learning them was only treating warfare like a game of chess. Xiang Liang gave up on his nephew eventually, who showed no sign of motivation or apparent talent apart from his great strength, and he let Xiang Yu decide his own destiny.

Rebelling against the Qin dynasty
Once, Xiang Liang killed someone and he fled with his family to Wu (吳; present-day southern Jiangsu) to evade the authorities. At the time, Qin Shi Huang was on an inspection tour in that area and Xiang Liang watched the emperor's procession pass by together with his nephew. Xiang Yu said, "I can replace him.". Xiang Liang was shocked and immediately covered his nephew's mouth with his hand. Since then, Xiang Liang began to see his nephew in a different light. Xiang Liang became an influential man in Wu due to his noble lineage and he became a representative for the people when dealing with the local authorities. He also made use of his fame and popularity to rally a group of supporters and secretly build up a militia.

In 209 BC, during the reign of Qin Er Shi, peasant rebellions erupted throughout China to overthrow the Qin dynasty, plunging China into a state of anarchy. Of these uprisings, the earliest one (the Dazexiang Uprising) was led by Chen Sheng and Wu Guang. Yin Tong, the Administrator of Kuaiji (then still located in Suzhou, rather than Shaoxing), wanted to start a rebellion as well, so he invited Xiang Liang to meet him and discuss their plans. However, the Xiangs killed Yin instead and Xiang Liang initiated the rebellion himself and rallied about 8,000 men to support him. Xiang Liang proclaimed himself Administrator of Kuaiji and appointed Xiang Yu as a general.

Xiang Liang led his men across the Yangtze River later and built his new base at Xiapi (下邳; present-day Pizhou, Jiangsu). At the time, some other rebel forces pledged allegiance to him, further increasing the size of his army to between 60,000 and 70,000. In 208 BC, following the advice of Fan Zeng, Xiang Liang sent his men to search for Xiong Xin, the grandson of King Huai I of Chu, and enthroned Xiong as "King Huai II of Chu". The king was actually a puppet ruler under Xiang Liang's control then, and was used by Xiang to rally support from people eager to help him overthrow the Qin dynasty and restore the former Chu state. Xiang Liang scored some victories against the Qin armies in a few battles.

Death
In 208 BC, Xiang Liang led his army to attack the Qin forces led by Zhang Han at the Battle of Dingtao. However, he underestimated the enemy and was killed in action. When Zhang Han was defeated later by Xiang Yu in the Battle of Julu, Xiang Yu had the 200,000 surrendered Qin soldiers buried alive as a propitiation to his late uncle.

References

External links
 Sima Qian. Records of the Grand Historian.

208 BC deaths
Chu–Han contention people
Year of birth unknown
People from Suqian
Generals from Jiangsu